Mahmudabad (also Romanized as Maḩmūdābād) is a village in Yanqaq Rural District in the Central District of Galikash County, Golestan Province, Iran. At the 2006 census, its population was 1,221, in 255 families.

References 

Populated places in Galikash County